Matthew Christopher Romios (born 29 March 1999) is an Australian tennis player.

Romios has a career high ATP singles ranking of 563 achieved on 23 September 2019. He also has a career high ATP doubles ranking of 511 achieved on 10 January 2022.

Romios made his ATP main draw debut at the 2022 Sydney International after receiving a wildcard into the doubles main draw with Moerani Bouzige.

Challenger and World Tennis Tour finals

Singles: 1 (0–1)

Doubles: 16 (7–9)

References

External links

1999 births
Living people
Australian male tennis players
Tennis players from Melbourne
21st-century Australian people